Aldo Maniacco (born 4 November 1934) is an Italian ice hockey player. He competed in the men's tournament at the 1956 Winter Olympics.

References

1934 births
Living people
Olympic ice hockey players of Italy
Ice hockey people from Ontario
Ice hockey players at the 1956 Winter Olympics
Sportspeople from Sault Ste. Marie, Ontario